The Men's keirin was one of the 6 men's events at the 2010 European Track Championships, held in Pruszków, Poland.

27 cyclists participated in the contest.

The event was held on November 7.

First round
First 2 riders in each heat qualified for the second round, remainder to first round repechage.

Heat 1

Heat 2

Heat 3

Heat 4

First Round Repechage
First rider in each heat qualified for the second round.

Heat 1

Heat 2

Heat 3

Heat 4

Second round
First 3 riders in each heat qualified for the final 1- 6 and the others to final 7 – 12.

Heat 1

Heat 2

Finals

Final 7-12 places

Final

References

First Round Results
First Round Repechage Results
Second Round Results
Finals Results

Men's keirin
European Track Championships – Men's keirin